Oliver "Ollie" Riedel (born 11 April 1971) is a German musician, best known as the bassist for Neue Deutsche Härte band Rammstein.

Early life
Riedel was born in Schwerin on 11 April 1971. Growing up, he had relatively good relationships with both of his parents. He attributes this to the small gap between their ages. As a child, he was not a good student, but he made his way through school with the assistance of his mother. Riedel was quite shy, especially during his teenage years; while his friends partied, he would often be found just "hanging around".

Career
In 1990, at the age of 19, Riedel began playing in a folk/punk band called the Inchtabokatables. In 1994, Riedel, Till Lindemann, Richard Kruspe, and Christoph Schneider entered and won the Berlin Senate Metro beat contest that allowed them to record a four-track demo professionally. Paul Landers and Christian "Flake" Lorenz would later join the band they named Rammstein.

The six released their first album, Herzeleid ("Heartache"), in September 1995. Their second album, Sehnsucht ("Desire"), was released in 1997, which would later become platinum. In April 2001, the album Mutter ("Mother") was released and a European tour followed, ending on 13 July 2002. It has been reported that at this time the members of Rammstein were seriously discussing whether to continue or not in their present form. It was decided that they should all take some time off and then reconsider whether to continue.

In 2003, Rammstein started to work on their fourth album, which turned out to be a turning point in the band's sound and maturity. In September 2004, the band saw their work pay off with the release of Reise, Reise ("travel, travel").

In 2005, Rosenrot ("Rose-Red") was released.

Rammstein's sixth album, Liebe ist für alle da ("Love is there for everyone"), was released in October 2009.

In May 2019, Rammstein released their untitled seventh album.

Their eighth and newest album Zeit ("Time") was released in May 2022.

Personal life
Riedel has two children, one a girl named Emma, and is separated from their mother.

He enjoys photography and sports, especially skateboarding and surfing. In the making of the video for "Keine Lust", he mentions wanting to go snowboarding while wearing a fat suit. He is the tallest member of Rammstein, standing in at 6 ft 7 in (2 m). It has also been said he is the most computer-literate member of the band.

Musicianship

Technique 
Riedel is primarily a fingerstyle player, although he uses a pick for most songs when playing live.

In certain softer songs, Riedel has been known to play with a banjo style plucking technique with his right hand to play arpeggiated chords, such as in "Seemann". He also plays the acoustic guitar introduction to "Frühling in Paris" in live shows.

Gear
His known gear is:

 Sandberg California PM
 Sandberg Terrabass signature model
 MusicMan Stingray (used during the early days of the band)
 ESP Eclipse bass (used during the Sehnsucht tour)
 Sandberg Plasmabass 4-string custom built model
 Tech 21 SansAmp Bass Driver DI
 Glockenklang Heart-Rock Amp (Later rig) 
 Ampeg SVT-II (Early rig)
 Ampeg 8x10 Cabs

Riedel also uses selected overdrive/fuzz pedals for songs such as "Mein Teil" and "Rosenrot".

References

External links

1971 births
Living people
German heavy metal bass guitarists
Male bass guitarists
People from Schwerin
Rammstein members
21st-century bass guitarists
German male guitarists
Industrial metal musicians